Sheikh Abdul Latif (also Sheikh Abdul Lateef; 15 August 1928 – 2 February 2000) was an Indian footballer. He participated at the 1952 Summer Olympics, 1956 Summer Olympics and the 1960 Summer Olympics, with Syed Abdul Rahim managed India. In 1959–60, he captained the national team.

Playing career
Latif during his playing days, was influenced by Indian football legend Syed Abdus Samad. In 1959, Latif led India in pre-Olympics and Merdeka tournament. In 1960, he was denied being the India captain for the Olympics. A couple of years later, he later migrated to Pakistan and represented the national team.

Honours

India
Asian Games Gold medal: 1951
 Colombo Cup: 1954
Merdeka Tournament runner-up: 1959

Bombay
 Santosh Trophy runner-up: 1958–59

See also
 List of association footballers who have been capped for two senior national teams
 India–Pakistan football rivalry

References

External links
 

1928 births
2000 deaths
Indian footballers
India international footballers
Olympic footballers of India
Footballers at the 1952 Summer Olympics
Footballers at the 1956 Summer Olympics
Footballers at the 1960 Summer Olympics
People from Purnia
Footballers from Bihar
Association football defenders
Footballers at the 1951 Asian Games
Footballers at the 1958 Asian Games
Medalists at the 1951 Asian Games
Asian Games gold medalists for India
Asian Games medalists in football
Mohammedan SC (Kolkata) players
Indian emigrants to Pakistan
Pakistani footballers
Pakistan international footballers
Dual internationalists (football)
Calcutta Football League players
Mumbai Football League players